Porrentruy railway station is a railway station in the municipality of Porrentruy, in the Swiss canton of Jura.

Services

Delémont–Delle line 
The following services stop at Porrentruy on the Delémont–Delle line, combining for half-hourly service to the south:

 RegioExpress: hourly service between Meroux or Delle and Biel/Bienne.
 Basel S-Bahn : hourly service to Olten.

Porrentruy–Bonfol line 
The following services stop at Porrentruy on the Porrentruy–Bonfol line:

 Regio: hourly service to Bonfol.

References

External links 
 
 

Railway stations in the canton of Jura
Swiss Federal Railways stations